Macropsychanthus is a genus of flowering plants in the legume family, Fabaceae. It belongs to the tribe  Diocleae, subfamily Faboideae.

Taxonomy
Many species of Dioclea were transferred to the genus Macropsychanthus as a result of a molecular phylogenetic study published in 2020.

Species
, Plants of the World Online accepted the following species:

Macropsychanthus apiculatus (R.H.Maxwell) L.P.Queiroz & Snak
Macropsychanthus aureus (R.H.Maxwell) L.P.Queiroz & Snak
Macropsychanthus bicolor (Hoffmanns. ex Benth.) L.P.Queiroz & Snak
Macropsychanthus circinatus (R.H.Maxwell) L.P.Queiroz & Snak
Macropsychanthus comosus (G.Mey.) L.P.Queiroz & Snak
Macropsychanthus coriaceus (Benth.) L.P.Queiroz & Snak
Macropsychanthus dictyoneurus (Diels) L.P.Queiroz & Snak
Macropsychanthus dolichobotrys Holthuis
Macropsychanthus duckei L.P.Queiroz & Snak
Macropsychanthus edulis (Kuhlm.) L.P.Queiroz & Snak
Macropsychanthus erectus (Hoehne) L.P.Queiroz & Snak
Macropsychanthus ferrugineus Merr.
Macropsychanthus flexuosus (Ducke) L.P.Queiroz & Snak
Macropsychanthus funalis (Poepp.) L.P.Queiroz & Snak
Macropsychanthus glabrus (Benth.) L.P.Queiroz & Snak
Macropsychanthus grandiflorus (Mart. ex Benth.) L.P.Queiroz & Snak
Macropsychanthus grandistipulus (L.P.Queiroz) L.P.Queiroz & Snak
Macropsychanthus haughtii (R.H.Maxwell) L.P.Queiroz & Snak
Macropsychanthus hexander (Ralph) L.P.Queiroz & Snak
Macropsychanthus hispidimarginatus (R.H.Maxwell) L.P.Queiroz & Snak
Macropsychanthus huberi (Ducke) L.P.Queiroz & Snak
Macropsychanthus jamesonii (R.H.Maxwell) L.P.Queiroz & Snak
Macropsychanthus javanicus (Benth.) L.P.Queiroz & Snak
Macropsychanthus latifolius (Benth.) L.P.Queiroz & Snak
Macropsychanthus lauterbachii Harms
Macropsychanthus macrocarpus (Huber) L.P.Queiroz & Snak
Macropsychanthus malacocarpus (Ducke) L.P.Queiroz & Snak
Macropsychanthus marginatus (Benth.) L.P.Queiroz & Snak
Macropsychanthus megacarpus (Rolfe) L.P.Queiroz & Snak
Macropsychanthus mindanaensis Merr.
Macropsychanthus mollicomus (Ducke) L.P.Queiroz & Snak
Macropsychanthus pulcher (Moldenke) L.P.Queiroz & Snak
Macropsychanthus purpureus (Elmer) L.P.Queiroz & Snak
Macropsychanthus rigidus (R.S.Cowan) L.P.Queiroz & Snak
Macropsychanthus ruddiae (R.H.Maxwell) L.P.Queiroz & Snak
Macropsychanthus rufescens (Benth.) L.P.Queiroz & Snak
Macropsychanthus scaber (Rich.) L.P.Queiroz & Snak
Macropsychanthus schimpffii (Diels) L.P.Queiroz & Snak
Macropsychanthus schottii (Benth.) L.P.Queiroz & Snak
Macropsychanthus sclerocarpus (Ducke) L.P.Queiroz & Snak
Macropsychanthus ucayalinus (Harms) L.P.Queiroz & Snak
Macropsychanthus umbrinus (Elmer) L.P.Queiroz & Snak
Macropsychanthus violaceus (Mart. ex Benth.) L.P.Queiroz & Snak
Macropsychanthus wilsonii (Standl.) L.P.Queiroz & Snak

References

Faboideae
Fabaceae genera